This is a list of canals in the state of New York, the artificial waterways built for drainage management or transportation.

List 
The following canals have existed in New York, United States.
Baldwinsville Canal
Black River Canal
Cayuga and Seneca Canal
Champlain Canal
Chemung Canal
Chenango Canal
Chenango Canal Extension
City Ship Canal
Clark and Skinner Canal
Crooked Lake Canal
Delaware and Hudson Canal
Erie Canal
Evans Ship Canal
Feeder Canal
Genesee Valley Canal
Glens Falls Feeder Canal
Gowanus Canal
Harlem Ship Canal
Hydraulic Canal
Junction Canal
Little Falls Canal
Love Canal (drainage)
Main and Hamburg Canal
Oneida Lake Canal
Oneida River Improvement
Oswego Canal
Scottsville Canal
Seneca River Towing-Path
Shinnecock Canal
Union Ship Canal

The New York State Canal System currently contains several of these canals.

Some summaries

See also

References

 
New York
Canals
Canals
Canals